Francis Paraison (c. 1958 – c. 2003) was a Haitian painter.
His painting Three Tigers in the Moonlight is part of the Huntington Museum of Art Haitian art collection.

References

Haitian painters
Haitian male painters
1950s births
2000s deaths